This article is about communications systems in Tonga.

Telephone

Main lines in use:
14,697 (2018)

Telephones - mobile cellular:
107,938 (2018)

Telephone system:

Fixed PSTN, GSM 900
domestic:
NA
international:
satellite earth station - 2 Intelsat (Pacific Ocean))

Radio
Broadcast stations:
AM 1 (2005), FM 5 (2005), shortwave 1 (1998)

Radios:
61,000 (1997)

Television
Broadcast stations:
4 (2005)

Televisions:
2,000 (1997)

In April 2002 the Tongasat company started its own satellite telecommunication service when it obtained the Esiafi 1 (former private American Comstar D4) satellite (launched in 1981) that was moved to Tonga's own geostationary point.

Internet
Internet Service Providers (ISPs):
2 (2005)

Country code (Top level domain): .to

Broadband internet communication is provided by the Tonga Cable System that went online in April 2018.

On 15 January 2022, following a volcanic eruption on the island of Hunga Tonga–Hunga Haʻapai, the Tonga Cable System was severed, leaving the country without Internet access. Using a satellite dish at the University of the South Pacific, the telecommunications company Digicel is providing limited 2G coverage to the island of Tongatapu, as well as giving residents free SIM cards.

Newspapers
Until 2002, the Auckland-based Pasifika Times was also circulated in Niue.

Notes

 
Tonga
Tonga